Avilla Township is a township in Comanche County, Kansas, United States.  As of the 2000 census, its population was 58.

Geography
According to the USGS, it contains one cemetery, Avilla.

References

External links
 City-Data.com

Townships in Comanche County, Kansas
Townships in Kansas